The Cosmos Samba, named after the dance of the same name, is a French ultralight trike that is produced by Cosmos ULM of Fontaine-lès-Dijon, France. The aircraft is supplied as a complete aircraft and is not available as a kit.

Design and development
The Samba is a minimalist aircraft, sometimes referred to as a nanolight-trike. It features a cable-braced hang glider-style high-wing, weight-shift controls, a single-seat, open cockpit, tricycle landing gear and a single engine in pusher configuration.

The aircraft is made from bolted-together aluminum tubing. The Tedlar-covered single surface wing is a French La Mouette Topless M design that uses an internal Kevlar cross-bar reinforcement in place of a kingpost and ground wires. The lower flying wires are retained, however, giving the aircraft a load rating of +6/-3g. Control is weight-shift via an "A" frame control bar.

Because of its low drag the aircraft is suitable for power-off soaring flight and the engine can be restarted in flight.

The Samba can be disassembled for storage or car-top transport in 20 minutes.

Specifications (Samba)

References

External links

Photo of a Cosmos Samba

1990s French ultralight aircraft
Single-engined pusher aircraft
Ultralight trikes